Wild Oats or wild oat may refer to:
 Avena, a genus of grasses collectively known as the oats
 Avena fatua, common wild oat
 Avena sterilis, wild oat or wild red oat
 Chasmanthium latifolium or wild oats, a grass
 Uvularia sessilifolia or wild oats, a bellwort
 Wild Oats (TV series), a 1994 sitcom 
 Wild Oats Markets, a natural foods and farmers' market chain of stores in North America
 Wild Oats XI, a maxi yacht
 Wild Oats (film), a 2016 film starring Shirley MacLaine and Jessica Lange
 Wild Oats (play), a 1791 comic play by John O'Keeffe, later rewritten and set in the American West by James McLure